Monica Baldwin (22 February 1893 – 17 November 1975) was a British writer and canoness regular for 28 years. After leaving her enclosed Order, she wrote of her experiences in a series of books which received a widespread audience at the time, giving the first direct account of life in a Religious Order, from a former member, in that period. She was the great-niece of British Prime Minister Stanley Baldwin.

Biography
Baldwin was born in Stourport, Worcestershire, England to Edward Arthur Baldwin and Lucilla Baldwin Livesey. Her great-grandfather was George Pearce Baldwin, grandfather of Stanley Baldwin.

Baldwin joined an enclosed religious order of Augustinian canonesses in 1914, a few months before the beginning of World War I. Ten years later she began to think she had made a mistake but it was another 18 years before she left, convinced that she "was no more fitted to be a nun than to be an acrobat." After 28 years of consecrated life there, she made the decision to leave the life, and requested dispensation from her religious vows, which was granted by the Vatican. During her years in the convent, Monica alternated between the English Convent in Bruges and a related Priory at Hazelgrove Park in Hayward's Heath. In 1938, she transferred to St Monica's Priory, then at Rawdon House in Hoddeson, Hertfordshire, and it was from there that she was released from her vows in October 1941. She left on 26 October 1941, during the Second World War.

Work and writing
Among her jobs outside were as a gardener in the Women's Land Army, as a matron in a camp for conscripted girl munitions workers, and as an army canteen hostess peeling potatoes. Once a photographer offered her a job developing "dirty pictures" in his cellar. After that she worked as an assistant librarian and then in the War Office.

In 1949, she published a memoir, I Leap Over The Wall: A Return to the World after Twenty-eight Years in a Convent. The book, later sub-titled, Contrasts and impressions after... is a memoir of some of the contrasts between life in an enclosed convent and life out in the contemporary world. Baldwin relates how she could not recall reading a newspaper during the entire course of the First World War. When she entered, the popular use of telephones, cinema and radio were in their infancy; when she left they were common in England.

Her novel, The Called and the Chosen, written as the diary of Sister Ursula Auberon, an enclosed nun at the Abbaye de la Sainte Croix, Framleghen, was published in 1957 by Farrar, Straus & Cudahy. The book followed the 1956 publication of The Nun's Story, a novel by Kathryn Hulme, about the life of her companion Marie Louise Habets, a Belgian former nun. In 1965, Baldwin published her second autobiographical book, called Goose in the Jungle. A Flight Round the World with Digressions.

Personal life
In the 1960s Baldwin lived on Alderney in the Channel Islands. She died in 1975 and is buried in Clare, Suffolk. In later life Baldwin moved to a religious retirement home near Bury St. Edmunds which would explain why she was buried in Suffolk.

See also

Enclosed religious orders
Marie Louise Habets
Munitionette, female workers in munitions factories in WW1

References

Sources
I Leap Over The Wall: A Return to the World after Twenty-eight Years in a Convent, Hamish Hamilton, London, 1949. 
"The Search for Monica Baldwin, Parts 1 to 4" by Pauline Annis. Stourbridge Civic Society Newsletter, Issues 46–49, April 2009 to April 2010, with a supplementary note in issue 50, April 2011.

External links

Contemporary review in Time magazine; unavailable 12 March 2021.

1893 births
1975 deaths
Augustinian canonesses
20th-century English Roman Catholic nuns
Former Roman Catholic religious sisters and nuns
British memoirists
British women novelists
20th-century British novelists
Stanley Baldwin
20th-century British women writers
People from Stourport-on-Severn
20th-century memoirists